Te Rongo Kirkwood (born 1973) is an artist from Auckland, New Zealand. She is known for her glass art, particularly in fused and slumped glass.

Career
Kirkwood credits her initial interest in glass art to meeting renowned glass artist Danny Lane in the United Kingdom. When she returned to New Zealand, her interest grew, but with two young children, she was not able to attend a formal multi-year course in glass art at a university. She purchased a glass kiln and began to learn independently.

Kirkwood's works have won recognition in a range of competitions and exhibitions. Her work was selected for inclusion in the Bombay Sapphire Blue Room exhibition in 2007, and for a Matariki-themed exhibition organised by Manukau City Council in 2009. In 2009 she won the Auckland Royal Easter Show art awards in the glass art category with her 'Puawai' piece. In 2014 and 2012, she was selected as a finalist in the Australian Ranamok Glass Prize

She has also contributed to the Project Twin Streams project in Waitakere by producing a major artwork near the pathway at Millbrook Esplanade. Her glass sculpture 'Te Aho Maumahara – Sacred Strand of Memories' hangs in the community area of the Devonport Library.

In 2014, her work was exhibited in the group show Te Hau A Uru: A Message from the West at Te Uru Waitakere Contemporary Gallery alongside artists Rebecca Baumann, Philip Dadson, Brett Graham, Lisa Reihana and Tanya Ruka. Between June 2015 and February 2016, Kirkwood's Ka Awatea series, previously displayed at Pataka Art + Museum in 2012, was exhibited at the De Young Fine Arts Museum in San Francisco. In June 2016, Kōrero Mai, Kōrero Atu, featuring the work of Kirkwood and jeweller Areta Wilkinson opened at the Auckland War Memorial Museum.

Exhibitions

Solo 
 Ka Awatea, Pataka Art + Museum, Porirua, 2012
 Nga Kakahu Karaihe, Milford Galleries, Dunedin, 11 April – 6 May 2015
 Ka Awatea, De Young (museum), San Francisco, CA, January 2014 – February 2016 
 Kōrero Mai, Kōrero Atu: Artists Areta Wilkinson and Te Rongo Kirkwood at Auckland Museum, Auckland War Memorial Museum, Auckland, 1 July – 11 September 2016
As Above, So Below, Milford Galleries, Dunedin, 22 April – 17 May 2017

Group 
 Te Hau a Uru: A Message from the West, Te Uru Waitakere Contemporary Gallery, Auckland, 1 November – 7 December 2014

Personal life 
Kirkwood is of Māori and Scots ancestry. She affiliates with Waikato, Taranaki, Te Wai-o-Hua, Te Kawerau and Ngāi Tai ki Tamaki iwi.

References 

1973 births
Living people
New Zealand glass artists
Women glass artists
New Zealand Māori artists
20th-century New Zealand sculptors
21st-century New Zealand sculptors
20th-century New Zealand women artists
21st-century New Zealand women artists
Ngāi Tai ki Tāmaki people
Te Kawerau ā Maki people
Taranaki (iwi)
Waikato Tainui people